The sanguine poison frog or Zaparo's poison frog (Allobates zaparo; in Spanish rana venenosa) is a species of frog in the family Aromobatidae. It is native to Ecuador and Peru, where it lives in tropical rainforest habitat.

The frog lays its eggs in forest leaf litter, then carries the young to water.

This species was treated in genus Epipedobates until phylogenetic analysis justified its transfer to Allobates.

References

zaparo
Amphibians of Ecuador
Amphibians of Peru
Taxonomy articles created by Polbot
Amphibians described in 1976